Julwania is a [[Nagar Panchayat (Notified Area Council)[city]] in Rajpur tehsil of Barwani district in the Indian state of Madhya Pradesh.

Geography

References

External links
 Barwani District

Barwani district
Cities and towns in Barwani district